Pease is a lunar impact crater that lies in the north-northwestern edge of the huge skirt of ejecta that surrounds the Mare Orientale impact basin. It lies just over one crater diameter to the east of the smaller crater Butlerov. To the east-northeast of Pease is the somewhat larger Nobel.

This is a roughly circular, bowl-shaped formation with an outer rim that is only moderately eroded. No significant craters lie across the rim edge or the interior. There is a slight straightening of the western rim.

References

 
 
 
 
 
 
 
 
 
 
 
 

Impact craters on the Moon